Be Careful with My Heart is a 2012 Philippine television drama series starring Jodi Sta. Maria and Richard Yap. The series aired on ABS-CBN's PrimeTanghali noontime block and worldwide via The Filipino Channel from July 9, 2012 to November 28, 2014.

Be Careful with My Heart is the longest-running morning drama series and one of ABS-CBN's most successful programs due to its immense popularity and critical acclaim, spawning albums, concerts and worldwide tours. The series has been aired in regions of Africa, around Asia, the Middle East and South America. It is the fourth Philippine television series to be shot in high definition format after Rounin, Minsan Lang Kita Iibigin, and Budoy.

Synopsis
A simple girl, Maya dela Rosa (Jodi Sta. Maria), her older sister, Cristina Rose, and Cristina's son, Cho, are introduced as tour guides in their hometown of San Nicolas, with their mother running a souvenir shop. Money is often less than the living expenses and household repairs. Cristina Rose hopes to work at sea, while Maya dreams of becoming a flight stewardess. One rainy night, after an attempt to fix the roof, Cristina breaks her leg and is thus unable to complete her schooling to become a seafarer. With a large medical bill, Maya deems it necessary to work overseas for two years to help her family. Upon arrival in Manila, Maya discovers that the woman who had offered work overseas had swindled her. Maya is stuck in Manila with no money or place to go. Relentless, Maya allows no one to stop her, not even the handsome, wealthy widower Richard Lim (Richard Yap), who reminds her of her shortcomings.

Ironically, Richard is her last hope because of his influence in the airline industry. He offers Maya to become his youngest daughter's (who has selective mutism) temporary nanny in exchange for his help. Maya agrees to become a maid and nanny in his household. Upon entering the Lim home, she finds herself involved in the private lives of Richard and his three problematic children: Luke (Jerome Ponce), Nikki (Janella Salvador) and Abby (Mutya Orquia).

Maya realizes that since Richard's wife died, the family's joy died with her; hence their problems. Maya is tasked to bridge Richard to his children and eventually she succeeds in rebuilding the family. However, in repairing their broken hearts, Maya encounters bigger challenges that test her determination and, more importantly, her heart. While fulfilling her obligation, she falls in love with the Lim children and, admittedly, with Richard.

Cast and characters

Main cast
 Jodi Sta. Maria as Maya dela Rosa-Lim –  At 25, Maya is a simple, idealistic provincial girl who dreams of becoming a flight stewardess but in a twist of events ends up becoming a nanny for a wealthy family in Manila. She took the job in exchange of an educational scholarship from her boss, Richard Lim. She is very family-oriented and will do everything to make her family's life in the province comfortable. She has an innocent charm, yet confident, and has a very positive attitude in life. Later in the series, she marries Richard and together they had twins Sky and Sunshine.
 Richard Yap as Richard "Sir Chief" Lim – He is the owner and president of the famous Lim Aviation Services, an aircraft maintenance repair and overhaul business. Known for being a cold, harsh and strict boss, he has one son and two daughters namely: Luke, Nikki and Abby. A widower of five years since losing his wife Alexandra in a plane crash, he hires Maya to take care of his youngest daughter after she rescues Abby from an incident at the airport. Maya endearingly calls him "Ser Chief." He later becomes a father again to the twins Sky and Sunshine upon marrying Maya.
 Mutya Orquia as Abigail Ruth "Abby" Lim – The youngest of the three, Abby had difficulty expressing herself when her mother died. Richard has spoiled Abby and she has become overly sensitive when she hears fights and arguments in the family. Richard ultimately decided to have her home schooled because they are afraid of Abby's condition. The Lim family hired many nannies in the past and no one lasted even a week because of Abby's difficult ways. But when Maya saves her from an accident at the airport, Abby finds an instant ally in the simple girl from Mindoro.
 Janella Salvador as Nikki Grace “Nik-Nik” Lim – She is the middle child and the spitting-image of her mother. After the death of her mom, Nikki tries to overcompensate for her loss and tries to take charge of her siblings. She always yearns for her father's attention and at first, she has taken a dislike for Maya, Abby's noisy, new nanny. Eventually, she warms up to Maya. She often speaks in Taglish. Later in the series, she develops a crush on her brother's best friend, Nicolo.
 Jerome Ponce as Luke Andrew Lim – When his mom died, Luke became the silent and rebellious eldest child. Aloof as he may seem, he cares for the welfare of his sisters but he tries to hide it if he can.
 Elisha Delos Santos as Sunshine Lim – The baby daughter of the Lim and Dela Rosa family, and the twin sister of Sky.
 Jeo Aquines as Sky Lim – The baby son of the Lim and Dela Rosa family, and the twin brother of Sunshine.

Supporting cast
 Aiza Seguerra as Cristina Rose "Kute" dela Rosa – Maya's sister, Teresita and Arturo's daughter and Cho's mother; called Kute – derived from "Kuya" and "Ate". Together with Jeff, they own the Little Pards Chibugan.
 Sylvia Sanchez as Teresita dela Paz-dela Rosa – Maya and Kute's mother, Mamang's daughter, Arturo's wife and Cho's grandmother.
 Lito Pimentel as Arturo dela Rosa – Maya and Kute's father, Teresita's husband, Mamang's son-in-law and Cho's grandfather.
 Gloria Sevilla as Felicidad "Manang Fe" Marcelo-Alejo – Richard's nanny when he was young and the head maid of the household. Later married to Mang Anastacio.
 Divina Valencia as Conchita "Mamang" dela Paz – Kute and Maya's loving grandmother and Teresita's mother.
 Rosario "Tart" Carlos as Dorina "Doris" Malasig – Sabel's close friend and a maid; later Abby's nanny in the Lim family.
 Viveika Ravanes as Isabel "Sabel" Fortuna-Lumaque – Doris' close friend and a cook/maid in the Lim family. Later married Jerry the Security Guard.
 Joan Marie Bugcat as Yaya Lea – A newly added nanny/ maid for the Lim Family.
 Karen Aiza Alimagno as Magda Dominguez – Kute's childhood best friend.
 JM Ibañez as Pocholo "Cho" Macavinta – Jeff and Kute's son.
 Micah Muñoz as Jose Mari "Joma" Adriano – The driver of the Lim family.
 Nathan Lopez as Emmanuel "Emman" Castro – Maya's friend/roommate.
 Marlo Mortel as Nicolo Angelo "Mallows" Cortez – Luke's best friend and Nikki's love interest. Nikki calls him "Mallows".
 Paul Jake Castillo as Simon Gabriel Corpuz – Maya's childhood friend, who used to court her.
 Shy Carlos as Maria Rosario Jonina "Joni" Quijano – Luke's co-intern at Lim Aviation Services; later became his girlfriend.
 Jeremiah "Bagito" Roxas as Ron-Ron – Bullied Cho at first; later became friends.
 Kelly Gwayne dela Cruz as Aira Denise Mendoza – Nicolo's best friend.
 Claire Ruiz as Josephine "Joey" Acosta – Luke's friend/ex-girlfriend. Also the former President of West Teatro in Northwest Hills.
 Mai-Mai Adriano as Megan – Nikki's classmate/friend.
 Abigail Francisco Macapagal as Stacy Gutierrez – Nikki's classmate/friend.
 Arvic Tan as Louie – Luke and Nicolo's friend.
 Mccoy De Leon as Iñigo Cabanatan – Trouble-maker during high school; later became Luke and Nicolo's friend.
 AJ Muhlach as Amiel Sebastian – Senior transferee in Nikki's school; later belongs to Luke's tropa.

Recurring cast
 Noel Trinidad as Don Roberto Lim – Richard's father and grandfather to the Lim children.
 Marissa Delgado as Doña Esmeralda Lim – Richard's mother and grandmother to the Lim children.
 Carlos "Rusty" Salazar as Mang Anastacio Alejo – Manang Fe's love interest; later became her husband.
 Tom Rodriguez as Jeff "Pards" Macavinta – Kute's friend and Cho's father; he later left the series (following his transfer to GMA-7 for his role on the then-upcoming drama, My Husband's Lover.)
 Maricar Reyes as Rafaella "Rafi" Alcantara – Richard's best friend.
 Assunta de Rossi as Katrina "Ina" Ruiz – Maya's boss who has a crush on Richard.
 Kalila Aguilos as Liza – Richard's former secretary.
 Johan Santos as Wilson de Juan – Maya's classmate.
 Diamond Shen as Jonah – Maya's classmate.
 Robert Ortega as Fred – Richard's assistant that moved and work to another company.
 Ya Chang as Engineer Yamaguchi – Richard's employee.
 Jerico Redrico as Lloyd
 Pinky Amador as Zenaida Belmonte – Maya's teacher.
 Cris Villanueva as Atty. Ryan Molina – Richard's friend and attorney.
 Terence Baylon as Elmer – Driver of a neighboring house near the Lim household. Sabel and Doris have a crush on him.
 Mark Luz as Engineer Gutierrez
 Hazel Faith dela Cruz as Edz Viray – A flight attendant and Maya's friend.
 Chris Bugoy as Bugoy
 Bryce Viray as Lance
 Carla Guevarra as Ms. Pacheco - Maya's instructor of Time Airways.
 Sier Edward Atienza Lao, Jade Gultiano, Pol Aron Casas, Erwin Strydom and Prince Ivan Nacachi as Tropa ni Iñigo – Iñigo's bad influenced friends.
 Bart Guingona as Charles- one of the Board of Directors of LAS.

Guest cast
 Nick Lizaso as Don Julio Demornay
 Sunshine Garcia as Stephanie
 Joyce So as Anna Martinez
 Dionne Monsanto as Teacher Emy – Abby's home-school teacher.
 Jed Montero as Teacher May Anne
 Joy Viado† as Senyang
 Melai Cantiveros as Yaya Gemma
 Karen Leslie Dematera as Gina
 Princess Manzon as Karisa
 Agatha Tapan as Yaya Melinda
 Bianca Saldua as Monica – Maya's friend.
 Cai Cortez as Luisa
 Meg Imperial as Sarah
 Andre Tiangco as Airline Purser
 Jomari Umpa as Pao
 Yanna Asistio as Angge
 John Arcilla as Wedding Priest
 Jose Mari Chan as Wedding Singer
 Bodjie Pascua as Ramon Francisco
 Lollie Mara as Norma Melendez
 Irma Adlawan as Victoria Reyes
 Leo Rialp as Antonio Garcia
 Kazel Kinouchi as Georgina Barrel
 Ketchup Eusebio as Dr. Tim Gonzaga
 Aleck Bovick as Lucinda Quijano – Joni's mother.
 Jon Lucas as Michael
 Jopay Paguia as Thea Lindsay Angeles – Kute's friend.
 Pamu Pamorada as Clarita
 Liza Diño as Mercy Selgado
 Jenny Miller as Betsy
 Katya Santos as Camille
 Art Acuña as Interviewer
 Mark Jayson Bañez as Boris – Pizza Delivery Boy and Doris' love interest.
 Sunshine Cruz as Alexandra "Alex" Lim – Richard's deceased wife and the mother of Luke, Nikki, and Abby. She died in an airplane crash.
 Luis Manzano as Capt. James Ventura Jr. – A pilot who works for Time Airways. He is also the son of the CEO of Time Airways.
 Ina Raymundo as Celeste Madrigal – LAS Former COO and Ralph Madrigal's Wife
 Regine Tolentino as Corrine Celeste – Maya and Richard's wedding planner.
 Edward Mendez as Charlie Ramirez – Rafi's boyfriend.
 Kathryn Bernardo as young Fe
 Daniel Padilla as young Anastacio
 Ping Medina as young Arturo dela Rosa
 Beauty Gonzalez as young Teresita dela Rosa
 Jenine Desiderio as Wedding Singer
 Jose Mari Chan as himself
 Dante Ponce as Don Fernando

Rerun
Be Careful with My Heart currently re-airs for the 10th year anniversary on Kapamilya Channel, Kapamilya Online Live and A2Z on July 18, 2022 on Kapamilya Mornings morning block at 9:00 AM replacing Flower Crew: Dating Agency (while the latter was transferred to Kapamilya Late Nights and replaced by Melting Me Softly). On August 8, 2022, the rerun's timeslot was changed to 10:00 AM (same timeslot on its former Saturday Recap block) in exchange with Magandang Buhay.

Reception
After ABS-CBN launched exclusive behind-the-scenes channels for Walang Hanggan and Princess and I, Be Careful With My Heart also featured its own exclusive interviews of the cast and crew in the network's website.

Ratings
The drama's pilot episode garnered a 15.2% nationwide rating, considerably high for a 'morning' drama, and dominated its competitor, GMA7's Chef Boy Logro: Kusina Master which got 8.8% according to data released by Kantar Media. Be Careful with My Heart premiered strongly on July 9, 2012, on the pre-noontime block, and ended in 2014 with a final rating of 19.6%. Be Careful With My Hearts ratings peaked during one of its airings in January 2013, reaching 31.3% nationwide rating, marking the all-time highest rating on daytime Philippine television by any non-sports or non-live show.

Cancelled Film
On June 18, 2013, Metropolitan Manila Development Authority (MMDA) announced the 8 entries competing for the 2013 Metro Manila Film Festival (MMFF), which includes the Be Careful With My Heart movie. Jodi Sta. Maria and  Richard Yap will reprise their roles for the movie, which will premiere on December 25, 2013. The film is said to be the continuation of where the chapter of the series will end shortly before MMFF, by early December 2013. In several recent interviews and appearances, Yap and Sta. Maria also mentioned that the only time their show will not air on television is during the time that the MMFF movie is being shown in cinemas. The show would however be back on air after the movie to continue the story.

In September 2013, the Be Careful With My Heart movie entry was pulled out from the Metro Manila Film Festival due to schedule conflicts of Yap and Sta. Maria. The head of the MMFF wrote a letter to the producer of the show to bring back the movie and even gave them an extension for the submission of the film. But the production team declined and instead continued the series.

Awards and nominations

Soundtrack

See also
List of programs broadcast by ABS-CBN
List of telenovelas of ABS-CBN

References

External links
Official website

Philippine romantic comedy television series
2012 Philippine television series debuts
2014 Philippine television series endings
ABS-CBN drama series
Filipino-language television shows
Television shows filmed in Japan
Television shows filmed in the Philippines
Maids in fiction